The 2013 Wolverine–Hoosier Athletic Conference women's basketball tournament is the 2013 post-season tournament for Wolverine–Hoosier Athletic Conference, an NAIA Division II athletic conference.

Format
Out of the league's 12 teams, the top eight receive berths in the conference tournament.  After the 22-game conference season, teams are seeded by conference record.

Bracket

References

Wolverine–Hoosier Athletic Conference basketball